Lana Citron (born 1969) is an Irish novelist, poet, short story writer, and screenwriter whose work has won awards.

Biography
Lana Citron was born in Ireland in 1969. She was educated at Trinity College, Dublin.

Citron has written several novels. She has also written poetry and short stories, while her short films have won awards including The Pears Foundation Award 2012. She was also a judge for The Pears Foundation Award in 2013. One of her short films is about a young Jewish girl's Holy communion which is based on the author's own Jewish faith.

A trained actress, Citron has also appeared in a variety of plays and in stand-up comedy. In 2004, she appeared in Four Queens Poker Show at the Edinburgh Festival.

Citron has written for radio and magazines, and has worked for the Huffington Post.

Citron has two sons and lives in Maida Vale, London.

Bibliography

Novels
 Sucker (1998)
 Spilt Milk (2001)
 Transit (2002)
 The Brodsky Touch (2007)
 The Honey Trap (2007)

Non fiction
 A Compendium of Kisses (2010)
 A Gastronomy of Kisses (2011)
  A Taste of Love and Desire

Short films

 ‘I was the Cigarette Girl,’
 ‘Hannah Cohen’s Holy Communion’

Radio play

 ‘Love Saboteur’.

References and sources

1969 births
Alumni of Trinity College Dublin
21st-century Irish women writers
Irish Jews
Living people